Lee Phillips (born 18 March 1979, in Aberdare) is a Welsh-born former footballer who is currently manager of A.F.C. Llwydcoed

Career
Phillips began his career at Cardiff City, making his debut in a 3–2 win over Hartlepool United in February 1997 as a replacement for Scott Young. During the following years he found opportunities hard to come by at the club before moving on to League of Wales outfit Barry Town in 2000 where he made just under 100 appearances including some appearances in European competition.

He then moved to Football Conference side Forest Green Rovers before returning to Wales to sign for Newport County. In June 2005 he signed for Llanelli, captaining them to the league title before joining Port Talbot Athletic in June 2008. However, he made a controversial return to Llanelli just 27 days later. In August 2010, he joined Carmarthen Town.

References

1979 births
Living people
Welsh footballers
Cardiff City F.C. players
Barry Town United F.C. players
Forest Green Rovers F.C. players
Newport County A.F.C. players
Llanelli Town A.F.C. players
Port Talbot Town F.C. players
Carmarthen Town A.F.C. players
Cymru Premier players
English Football League players
Footballers from Aberdare
Association football defenders